Veatchite is an unusual strontium borate, with the chemical formula Sr2B11O16(OH)5·H2O. There are two known polytypes, veatchite-A and veatchite-p.

Veatchite was discovered in 1938, at the Sterling Borax mine in Tick Canyon, Los Angeles County, California. Veatchite is named to honor John Veatch, the first person to detect boron in the mineral waters of California.

See also

 List of minerals

References

External links

Strontium minerals
Phylloborates
Monoclinic minerals
Minerals in space group 9